John Lewis Jackson (July 15, 1909 – October 22, 1956) was a pitcher in Major League Baseball. He played for the Philadelphia Phillies in 1933.

External links

1909 births
1956 deaths
Major League Baseball pitchers
Philadelphia Phillies players
Harrisburg Senators players
Baseball players from Ohio